McNutt is a surname of either Scottish or Irish origin. It refers to:
Persons
Alexander McNutt (1725–1811), British army officer, colonist, and land agent
Alexander McNutt (1802–1848), American politician from Mississippi; governor and state senator
Charles H. McNutt (1928–2017), American archaeologist
Chris McNutt (born 1986), American conservative activist and gun rights lobbyist
Clarence McNutt (1907–1972), American canoeist
James R. McNutt, American politician from Michigan
John McNutt (1914–1992), Irish Anglican priest
John G. McNutt, American professor and author
Marcia McNutt (born 1952), American geophysicist and oceanographer
Marvin McNutt (born 1989), American football wide receiver for the Carolina Panthers
Mollie McNutt (1885–1919), Australian poet
Paul V. McNutt (1891–1955), American politician from Indiana; governor, high commissioner, ambassador, and federal agency administrator
Ronnie McNutt (1987–2020), American veteran who fatally shot himself on a Facebook livestream
Russell Alton McNutt (1914–2008), American engineer and alleged spy
Sarah McNutt (1839–1930), American physician
Tico McNutt, American wildlife researcher
Todd McNutt (born 1964), Canadian former cyclist
Walter McNutt (born 1940), Montana State Senate
William Slavens McNutt (1885–1938), American screenwriter

Fictional persons
Boob McNutt, comic strip by Rube Goldberg 1915–34

See also
MacNutt
MacNutt (surname)

Anglicised Scottish Gaelic-language surnames
Surnames of Ulster-Scottish origin